Yuliya Shakhova (born 29 May 1976) is an Uzbekistani sport shooter. She competed at the 2000 Summer Olympics in the women's 50 metre rifle three positions event, in which she tied for 30th place, and the women's 10 metre air rifle event, in which she tied for 32nd place.

References

1976 births
Living people
ISSF rifle shooters
Uzbekistani female sport shooters
Olympic shooters of Uzbekistan
Shooters at the 2000 Summer Olympics
Asian Games medalists in shooting
Shooters at the 1998 Asian Games
Asian Games bronze medalists for Uzbekistan
Medalists at the 1998 Asian Games
20th-century Uzbekistani women
21st-century Uzbekistani women